Scrobipalpa magnificella is a moth of the family Gelechiidae. It is found in Russia (the southern Ural), Ukraine, Syria, Iran, Mongolia, Uzbekistan and China (Xinjiang).

References

Moths described in 1967
Scrobipalpa